Ladislav Karabin (born February 16, 1970 in Bratislava, Czechoslovakia) is a retired professional ice hockey player who played nine games in the National Hockey League.  He played for the Pittsburgh Penguins.

Personal life 
Karabin resides in Fort Pierce, Florida with his wife Catherine, and their two daughters, Lacey and Saxon.

Career statistics

External links 

1970 births
Living people
Cleveland Lumberjacks players
Iserlohn Roosters players
Los Angeles Ice Dogs players
Pittsburgh Penguins draft picks
Pittsburgh Penguins players
Revier Löwen players
Rochester Americans players
Schwenninger Wild Wings players
Czechoslovak ice hockey left wingers
Slovak ice hockey left wingers
HC Slovan Bratislava players
HK Spišská Nová Ves players
Ice hockey people from Bratislava
Grizzlys Wolfsburg players
Slovak expatriate ice hockey players in Germany
Slovak expatriate ice hockey players in the United States